Bakara Conservation Park is a protected area of mallee scrub in the Murray Mallee region of South Australia. It is located in the locality of Maggea on the southern side of the  Stott Highway.

The conservation park consists of land in sections 54 and 55 in the cadastral unit of the Hundred of Bakara. Section 55 was compulsory acquired by the Government of South Australia in 1983 and was proclaimed on 15 May 1986 as a conservation park under the National Parks and Wildlife Act 1972. It was extended to the north by the addition of Section 54 on 6 August 2009.

The conservation park provides habitat for malleefowl, and local landholders are involved in active fox and rabbit control in the conservation park and nearby farmland.

It is classified as an IUCN IUCN Category Ia protected area.

References

External links
  Webpage on the Protected Planet website
Webpage on the BirdsSA website

Conservation parks of South Australia
1986 establishments in Australia
Protected areas established in 1986
Murray Mallee